"Banana" is a song by the Jamaican reggae artist Conkarah featuring the Jamaican international artist Shaggy. The song released in 2019 by S-Curve Records samples largely and is an adaptation of a famous song by Harry Belafonte called "Day-O (The Banana Boat Song)" released in 1956. The Belafonte original is a work song, from the point of view of dock workers working the night shift loading bananas onto ships. The lyrics describe how daylight has come, their shift is over, and they want their work to be counted up so that they can go home.

Dj FLe – Sick Wit it Crew Minisiren Remix
Conkarah's song trended after the popularity of the "banana drop challenge" in the Spring of 2020, where TikTok users utilized a particular version of "Banana" which was remixed and produced by DJ FLe of Sick Wit it Crew. The challenge is as follows: As one is dancing, his or her glasses or more prominently sunglasses are propped on top of the dancer's head. After a few frenetic dance and hand moves, the glasses drop over the dancer's eyes at the exact right time in the song where the lyrics say "Sick Wit it Crew Drop" before the siren solo comes in.

Performance
"Banana" became an international hit and topped the Dutch Top 40 chart for 5 consecutive weeks starting the week ending 27 June 2020 until 25 July 2020. It also charted in a great number of European and international charts.

Track listing
Banana Remix EP (released 17 July 2020)
"Banana" (featuring Shaggy) [DJ FLe – Minisiren Remix] – 3:30
"Banana" (featuring Shaggy) [Dave Audé Remix] – 3:21
"Banana" (featuring Shaggy) [Lady Bee Remix] – 2:25
"Banana" (featuring Shaggy) [Faustix Remix] – 2:40
"Banana" (featuring Shaggy) [Dinaire + Bissen Remix] – 5:49
"Banana" (featuring Shaggy) [James Anthony's Big Room Remix] – 4:37

Charts

Weekly charts

Year-end charts

Certifications

References

External links
Conkarah official website
Conkarah Facebook

2019 songs
2019 singles
2020 singles
Shaggy (musician) songs
Internet memes introduced in 2020